The S3 is a regional railway service of the Zürich S-Bahn on the Zürcher Verkehrsverbund (ZVV), the Zürich transportation network. It is operated by Swiss Federal Railways.

Route 
 

The core of the service links Wetzikon, in the east of the canton of Zürich, and Zürich Hardbrücke, in central Zürich. This core service runs via the Hinwil–Effretikon line, joining the Winterthur–Zürich line at Effretikon. It then runs via the Zürichberg Tunnel and stopping at Zürich Stadelhofen and Zurich Hauptbahnhof.

The following stations are served:

Route map

History 
Up until December 2018, the S3 operated via the Zürich–Baden railway as far as Dietikon, instead of turning north to Bülach. Alternate trains continued further along the Zürich to Olten line, from Dietikon to Aarau, in the canton of Aargau. An extended  replaced the S3 between Hardbrücke and Aarau.

Rolling stock 
 all services are operated Re 450 class locomotives pushing or pulling double-deck passenger carriages.

Scheduling 
Over the core route between Wetzikon and Hardbrücke, the normal frequency is one train every 30 minutes. A limited number of trains operate to and from Bülach during peak hours. A journey over the full length of the service takes 60 minutes.

See also 

 Rail transport in Switzerland
 Trams in Zürich

References

External links 

 ZVV

Zürich S-Bahn lines
Transport in Aargau
Transport in the canton of Zürich
Wetzikon
Dietikon